Baghcheh Jik (also Romanized as Bāghcheh Jīk and Bāghchehjīk) is a village in Zulachay Rural District, in the Central District of Salmas County, West Azerbaijan Province, Iran. At the 2006 census, its population was 858, in 203 families.

References 

Populated places in Salmas County